Rhabdochaeta advena is a species of tephritid or fruit flies in the genus Rhabdochaeta of the family Tephritidae.

Distribution
Tanzania.

References

Tephritinae
Insects described in 1942
Diptera of Africa